Mathematically Correct was a U.S.-based website created by educators, parents, mathematicians, and scientists who were concerned about the direction of reform mathematics curricula based on NCTM standards. Created in 1997, it was a frequently cited website in the so-called Math wars, and was actively updated until 2003.

History 
Although Mathematically Correct had a national scope, much of its focus was on advocating against mathematics curricula prevalent in California in the mid-1990s. When California reversed course and adopted more traditional mathematics texts (2001 - 2002), Mathematically Correct changed its focus to reviewing the new text books. Convinced that the choices were adequate, the website went largely dormant.

Mathematically Correct maintained a large section of critical articles and reviews for a number of math programs. Most of the program opposed by Mathematically Correct had been developed from research projects funded by the National Science Foundation. Most of these programs also claimed to have been based on the 1989 Curriculum and Evaluation Standards for School Mathematics published by the National Council of Teachers of Mathematics.

Mathematically Correct's main point of contention was that, in reform textbooks, traditional methods and concepts have been omitted or replaced by new terminology and procedures. As a result, in the case of the high-school program Core-Plus Mathematics Project, for example, some reports suggest that students may be unprepared for college level courses upon completion of the program.  Other programs given poor ratings include programs aimed at elementary school students, such as Dale Seymour Publications (TERC) Investigations in Numbers, Data, and Space and Everyday Learning Everyday Mathematics.

After Mathematically Correct's review of the programs, many have undergone revisions and are now with different publishers. Other programs, such as Mathland have been terminated.

Reviews by the site 
Publications with poor reviews from Mathematically Correct include:
 Addison-Wesley Secondary Math: An Integrated Approach: Focus on Algebra
 Core-Plus Mathematics Project
 Investigations in Numbers, Data, and Space
 Mathland
 NCTM's 1989 Standards produced by the professional association for teachers of mathematics. The Standards encouraged increased emphasis on problem solving and decreased attention to algorithms learned by rote. It was perceived by some critics to recommend elimination of standard algorithms.
Curricula not judged deficient by Mathematically Correct include:
 Singapore math – Math textbooks used in Singapore
 Saxon math – A program created by a retired Air Force officer who had been highly critical of mathematics teaching reforms from the late 1960s to 1990s.

State tests that were judged deficient by Mathematically Correct are:
 CLAS – A defunct California test, based on NCTM standards and California mathematics standards replaces in 2002
 WASL – Washington State standards

References

External links 
 MathematicallyCorrect.com which is "devoted to the concerns raised by parents and scientists about the invasion of our schools by the New-New Math and the need to restore basic skills to math education".
 MathematicallySane.com "Promoting the rational reform in mathematics education" (a website critical of anti-reformers such as Mathematically Correct)

Traditional mathematics
Mathematics education
Mathematics education reform